Montie Montana (born Owen Harlen Mickel; June 21, 1910 – May 20, 1998) was a rodeo trick rider and trick roper, actor, stuntman and cowboy inducted into the ProRodeo Hall of Fame in 1994.

Biography
Montana was born in Wolf Point, Montana, in 1910. He was a perennial participant in the Tournament of Roses Parade until his death in Los Angeles, California, in 1998. Television viewers know him from more than 60 appearances, waving to the crowd from his silver saddle. He can be seen as a contestant on the May 7, 1959 television broadcast of You Bet Your Life, along with his horse Rex.

Montana would go to elementary schools and perform with Rex. He was at Camellia Avenue Elementary School in North Hollywood, California, in 1959, and he would talk about the rubber horseshoes Rex would be fitted with so Rex would not slip on the asphalt playground while Montie was riding Rex. He performed rope tricks on and off of Rex, and would pass out photos of him and Rex to the students at the end of his show.

In 1996, a Golden Palm Star on the Palm Springs, California, Walk of Stars was dedicated to him. He was buried at the Oakwood Memorial Park in Chatsworth, California.

Filmography

Honors 
 1989 Rodeo Hall of Fame of the National Cowboy and Western Heritage Museum
 1990 Pendleton Round-Up and Happy Canyon Hall of Fame
 1994 ProRodeo Hall of Fame
 1997 Ellensburg Rodeo Hall of Fame
 2011 Cheyenne Frontier Days Hall of Fame
 2015 Montana Cowboy Hall of Fame & Western Heritage

References

External links

 

People from Wolf Point, Montana
American male film actors
Tournament of Roses
1910 births
1998 deaths
20th-century American male actors
ProRodeo Hall of Fame inductees
Trick roping
Trick riding